Below is a list of power stations in Iraq.

Non-renewable

Thermal

Natural gas 

Yusufiyah
Location: Salahuddin
8 X 210 MW
construction halted?
|-|||||
Nassiriyah GAS power plant 
AL nassiriyah 
500 MW
open cycle

Renewable

Hydroelectric

See also

Energy policy of Iraq
Electricity sector in Iraq
List of largest power stations in the world

References 

Power stations
Iraq